The men's pommel horse competition was one of eight events for male competitors in artistic gymnastics at the 1960 Summer Olympics in Rome. It was held on 5, 7, and 10 September at the Baths of Caracalla. There were 128 competitors from 28 nations, with nations in the team competition having up to 6 gymnasts and other nations entering up to 2 gymnasts. There was a tie for first place in the pommel horse. Boris Shakhlin of the Soviet Union and Eugen Ekman of Finland each received a gold medal. It was the third consecutive Games with a gold medal for the Soviets, as Shakhlin became the first man to successfully repeat as Olympic champion in the event (and second to win multiple medals of any color). Ekman's medal was the only medal in men's artistic gymnastics in 1960 that did not go to the Soviet Union or Japan. Third place and the bronze medal went to Japan's Shuji Tsurumi.

The 1960 gymnastics competitions introduced apparatus finals, with the all-around competition serving as a qualifying round for the pommel horse final.

Background

This was the 10th appearance of the event, which is one of the five apparatus events held every time there were apparatus events at the Summer Olympics (no apparatus events were held in 1900, 1908, 1912, or 1920). Five of the top 11 (including ties for 9th) gymnasts from 1956 returned: gold medalist Boris Shakhlin of the Soviet Union, silver medalist Takashi Ono of Japan, fifth-place finisher Yury Titov of the Soviet Union, sixth-place finisher Jaroslav Bím of Czechoslovakia, and seventh-place finisher Masao Takemoto of Japan. Shakhlin was also the reigning (1958) world champion.

Morocco and South Korea each made their debut in the men's pommel horse; the short-lived United Arab Republic made its only appearance. The United States made its ninth appearance, most of any nation, having missed only the inaugural 1896 Games.

Competition format

The gymnastics all-around events continued to use the aggregation format. Each nation entered a team of six gymnasts or up to two individual gymnasts. All entrants in the gymnastics competitions performed both a compulsory exercise and a voluntary exercise for each apparatus. The scores for all 12 exercises were summed to give an individual all-around score. 

These exercise scores were also used for qualification for the new apparatus finals. The two exercises (compulsory and voluntary) for each apparatus were summed to give an apparatus score; the top 6 in each apparatus participated in the finals; others were ranked 7th through 130th. For the apparatus finals, the all-around score for that apparatus was multiplied by one-half then added to the final round exercise score to give a final total.

Exercise scores ranged from 0 to 10, with the final total apparatus score from 0 to 20.

Schedule

All times are Central European Time (UTC+1)

Results

References

Official Olympic Report
www.gymnasticsresults.com
www.gymn-forum.net

Men's pommel horse
Men's 1960
Men's events at the 1960 Summer Olympics